Just Maath Maathalli (English translation: Just your chatter) is a 2010 Indian Kannada romance film written and directed by Sudeep starring himself, Ramya and Rajesh Nataranga in the lead roles. The film follows Siddharth's search for Tanu to confess his love for her.

Sudeep first approached producer Shanker Gowda to produce an action film which he wanted to direct. But, during discussions of the script, the idea of Just Maath Maathalli came up and Shanker Gowda showed immense interest in producing it. Sudeep went on to script and direct the film.

Plot
Siddharth, a singer in a rock band, leaves for Singapore from Bangalore. On the flight, he meets Adi, a screenwriter, who takes a liking to Siddharth and asks him about his trip. Siddharth tells him that he was going in search of a girl, Tanu whom he liked. An amused Adi gets him to narrate the story.

Tanu's Story- Siddharth, standing at the precipice of a suicide point is looking down the cliff when Tanu, a stranger to Siddharth, pulls him back assuming he was attempting suicide and reprimands his act without allowing him to explain his actions. Siddharth walks away and sits by a lake. Again Tanu sees him and presumes he would jump into the water in his attempt to kill himself. She rushes  to stop him again and gives him another dress-down. Disgusted, he goes to a tea stall by the road and orders for coffee. As he is adding sugar-free cubes into his coffee, Tanu notices him from a distance and again assuming that he is adding poison to his coffee rushes to his side and knocks down the tumbler from his hand before he takes his first sip. Siddharth, by now evidently tired of her unsolicited good Samaritan  ways, lashes back. He tells her that he was only trying to see the depth of the cliff at the suicide point, and was trying to splash some water on his face at the lake and that he was adding sugar-free cubes into his glass, all of which she misunderstood as suicidal attempts by him. He walks away after assuring her that he is NOT suicidal.

Later, at a railway station, while waiting for his train Siddharth sees Tanu running into the station trying to catch a departing train. She anyway misses the train and sits on a bench tired. She asks the station master directions to the toilet. She decides to use the sky-walk to reach the other side of the platform, where the toilet is. As she goes up the sky-walk, Siddharth who is sitting on a bench beside hers, notices a beggar who was sitting nearby, missing. He walks up the sky-walk and witnesses the beggar trying to steal gold bangles from Tanu. He shouts at the beggar and Tanu finds this distraction enough to kick the beggar in his groin and runs towards Siddharth. They both go down and sit on a bench exhausted. They introduce themselves and Siddharth suggests he keep the bangle for safekeeping. She agrees and he tucks the bangle into his backpack.

Suddenly, Tanu sees the beggar walking back towards them with four more people. The couple make a dash for it and hide in a dark cattle shed with few oxen. One of baddies enters the shed and gets kicked by an ox. The others think that Siddharth hit their partner and run away scared.

Next morning Tanu departs for her destination by the morning train. After she leaves, Siddharth realizes that her bangle is with him. He gets her address from a telephone booth from where she had earlier called home. He sets out to her hometown to return the bangle. He meets her and gives the bangle to her. She insists that he stay with her family for a few days. He agrees and she introduces him to her family members.

Tanu falls in love with Siddaharth and he too starts liking her. On the day he is leaving, Tanu proposes her love to him. But, to her disbelief, he rejects her proposal. He then leaves to Bangalore.

On the flight- Adi is shocked and wonders why he rejected her proposal. Siddharth narrates another incident which changed him to not get emotionally involved with girls.

Flashback 3 years ago- Divya (Keerthi Gowda), a big fan of Siddharth proposes her love to him. He does not understand the seriousness of her craze for him and accepts her proposal just to hang around with her. Once at a mall along with Siddharth's band, he gets called on work. He informs Divya to go home as he has work to attend. Divya insists on going with him reasoning that since she is his girlfriend she should know about his work. Siddharth realizes that she had taken the relationship very seriously and admonishes her explaining that he did not want to get into a real relationship with her. He leaves her and goes away. She is lovelorn and commits suicide that night. Siddharth is depressed on realizing that he was the reason for her suicide decides never to get involved with girls.

Tanu's story- Siddharth narrates his Tanu experience to a friend who advises him get her as he loves her. He goes back to her house only to find that she has left to Singapore.

And on this plane to Singapore he meets Adi. On reaching Singapore, Adi invites him home. Siddharth accepts the invitation and sets out to find Tanu. Meanwhile, Adi is getting married and  invites Siddharth to his wedding. At the wedding Siddharth is shocked to see the bride, Tanu. Without another word, he leaves the wedding hall to the airport. On his way to the airport, he calls Adi to inform him that he has found his Tanu. But he requests Adi not to use his story and suggests he forget it. Adi agrees. 
Movie credits start rolling.

Cast
 Sudeep as Siddharth
 Ramya as Nandini Appaiah "Tanu"
 Rajesh Nataranga as Adi
 M. G. Srinivas as Tanu's brother
 Arun Sagar as Abhi, Siddharth's bandmate
 Avinash as Tanu's father
 Rangayana Raghu as actor on film set
 Sarovar Sanjeev as Divya's grandfather
 Bhuvann Ponnannaa as Siddharth's bandmate

Accolades

58th Filmfare Awards South :- 
Filmfare Award for Best Actor - Kannada - Nominated - Sudeep
Filmfare Award for Best Actress - Kannada - Nominated - Ramya
Filmfare Award for Best Female Playback Singer - Kannada - Nominated - Shreya Ghoshal

Karnataka State Film Awards :-
 Best Sound Recording - Won - Kumar
 Best Female Voice Dubbing - Won - Deepu for the role of Ramya

Suvarna Film Awards :-
Best Film - Nominated
Best Director - Nominated - Sudeep
Best Actor - Nominated - Sudeep
Best Actress - Nominated - Ramya
Favorite Heroine - Won - Ramya
Best Lyricist - Won - Raghavendra Kamath for the song "Munjaane Manjalli"
Favorite Song - Nominated - for the song "Munjaane Manjalli"

Soundtrack

Raghu Dixit composed the music of Sudeep's Just Maath Maathalli. It was launched recently, which saw many big names like Bollywood actor Vivek Oberoi, Tamil actor Silambarasan, Telugu star Jagapathi Babu. The event also saw Ambareesh and well-known producer Rockline Venkatesh on 18 Dec 2009 at Le Meridian, Bangalore.

This is the first Indian movie to have six title tracks. This is also the only Indian movie in which all the songs of the album are title tracks.

Reception

Critical response 

Shruti Indira Lakshminarayana of Rediff.com scored the film at 2.5 out of 5 stars and says "The narration technique and balance maintained between dialogues and visuals stand out. Sudeep is convincing as both a recluse and a popular singer. Ramya looks good and is a perfect foil for the introvert Sid. Rajesh, who plays the spirited Adi, does justice to his role. Arun Sagar and Avinash are also part of the cast. Costumes add zing to the characters and make them very relatable". A critic from Deccan Herald wrote "Till the drunken scene in the second half, there is enough momentum. The drunken philosophising risks getting people irritated, or fall in, full “fida”. The climax is a letdown to hardcore Sudeep fans. The film entertains nonetheless. Sri Venkat’s camera and Raghu Dixit’s music lend themselves to the director’s vision, embellishing the narration. Rohith and Sudeep excel". A critic from The Times of India Scored the film at 4 out of 5 stars wrote  "While Sudeep excels as a singer and lover boy, Ramya, the `pakkadamane hudugi, is charming with brilliant expressions and dialogue delivery and Rajesh is superb. Melodious numbers by Raghu Dixit are music to the ears and Venkats pleasing camerawork is another highlight of the film".

Remake 
Indian Express reported that the Hindi remake of the film is in pipeline in 2010.

References

External links
 

2010 films
Films scored by Raghu Dixit
2010s Kannada-language films
2010 romantic drama films